Althegnenberg station is a railway station in the municipality of Althegnenberg, located in the district of Fürstenfeldbruck in Upper Bavaria, Germany.

References

External links

Railway stations in Bavaria
Buildings and structures in Fürstenfeldbruck (district)